Nikolskoye is a rural locality (a selo) and the administrative center of Nikolsky Selsoviet, Sovetsky District, Altai Krai, Russia. The population was 746 as of 2013. There are 16 streets.

Geography 
It is located 10 km south-west from Sovetskoye.

References 

Rural localities in Sovetsky District, Altai Krai